Raw Vision is a British magazine devoted to outsider art and edited by John Maizels. It features content about the subject worldwide.

History
Raw Vision was founded by John Maizels in 1989 as a way of telling people about outsider art, with a small freelance staff and text contributed by scholars.  Each issue features outsider artists from different countries, as well as covering general news on the subject of outsider art from around the world.

Raw Vision has been described as "outsider art's Rolling Stone", and in 2007 was cited as the only publication devoted exclusively to this art form. Over the years, it has featured several hundred self-taught and visionary artists, many of whom were completely unknown. It also features visionary environments—sculpture gardens, self built architecture and unique buildings.

It defines outsider art as "creative expression that exist outside accepted cultural norms, or the realm of 'fine art'", and says that its "creators would not consider themselves artists, nor would they even feel that they were producing art at all."

Other important outsider art magazines
O.O.A. (Rivista dell'Osservatorio Outsider Art, University of Palermo), originally published in 2010, is a six-monthly review directed by Eva di Stefano and published on paper by Edizioni Museo Pasqualino (http://www.edizionimuseopasqualino.it). This magazine is known for its  splendidly illustrated  pages and for gathering together some of the most important international contributors of the outsider art world.

See also
Saving and Preserving Arts and Cultural Environments

References

External links
Raw Vision web site

Visual arts magazines published in the United Kingdom
Magazines established in 1989
Works about outsider art
Contemporary art magazines